The 2014 Trofeo Alfredo Binda-Comune di Cittiglio was the 39th running of the women's Trofeo Alfredo Binda-Comune di Cittiglio, a women's bicycle race in Italy.

Results

References

Trofeo Alfredo Binda
Trofeo Alfredo Binda
Trofeo Alfredo Binda-Comune di Cittiglio